The Society of Dyers and Colourists (SDC) is an international professional society, with headquarters in Bradford, West Yorkshire, UK, specializing in colour in all its manifestations. Founded in 1884, it was granted a Royal Charter of Incorporation in 1963. The SDC is a registered charity.

Together with the American Association of Textile Chemists and Colorists, SDC publishes the Colour Index International, which is recognized as the authoritative source on colourants. Colour Index International is used to identify the pigments and dyes used in manufacturing inks, paints, textiles, plastics, and other materials. Since 1884 SDC have published the Journal of the Society of Dyers and Colourists, a journal relaunched in 1999 as Coloration Technology.

The Society is a member of the Science Council.

External links 
Society of Dyers and Colourists

References

Color organizations
Textile industry of the United Kingdom
Dyers and Colourists